Star Wars: Jedi vs. Sith is a six-part Star Wars comic series which was released in a trade paperback graphic novel format. It was created by Ramon F. Bachs, Raul Fernandez and Darko Macan. It was published by Dark Horse Comics (and by Titan Books in Britain).

Synopsis

The events depicted are set in the Star Wars expanded universe about 1000 years before the prequel films. It tells the story of the Battle of Ruusan, which concludes the New Sith Wars between the Sith and the Jedi. The comic books series depicts the apparent destruction of the Sith order, caused by them using a destructive Force technique called a thought bomb against the Jedi but which ends up destroying the Sith as well. It describes how and why Darth Bane, the sole Sith survivor of the Battle of Ruusan reforms the Sith order into having the one-master-one-apprentice structure known from the films. All these events are seen through the eyes of three children from a backwater planet recruited into the rank of the Jedi, one of whom, Darth Zannah, becomes the first apprentice in the new Sith order.

Describing the events that lead to the construction of the monument, the Valley of the Jedi, Jedi vs. Sith acts as a distant prequel to the Jedi Knight computer game. By involving Darth Bane and the reformation of the Sith, it also helps establish the background for the Star Wars films. Much of the story of the comic book series is adapted into the novel Darth Bane: Path of Destruction, and is continued in the subsequent novels Darth Bane: Rule of Two and Darth Bane: Dynasty of Evil.

External links

 Official CargoBay Listing

Jedi
Sith
Star Wars Legends novels